Patrick Chabal (29 April 1951 – 16 January 2014) was a leading Africanist of the late 20th and early 21st century. He had a long career in academics. Patrick Chabal's latest position was Chair in African History & Politics at King's College London. He published numerous books, book chapters and articles about Africa. He was one of the founders of AEGIS (Africa-Europe Group for Interdisciplinary Studies) and was a board member for many years.

Major publications
Amílcar Cabral. Revolutionary leadership and people's war (Cambridge: Cambridge UP, 1983)
with Jean-Pascal Daloz: Africa Works: disorder as political instrument (Oxford, Currey, 1999)
with Jean-Pascal Daloz: Culture Troubles: politics and the interpretation of meaning (London, Hurst, 2006) 
with Ulf Engel & Leo de Haan (eds): African Alternatives (2007) 
Africa: the politics of suffering and smiling (2009)
The end of Conceit: Western rationality after postcolonialism (2012)

References

External links
 Professional page at King's College London
 Chabal's publications at Worldcat

British Africanists
Academics of King's College London
1951 births
2014 deaths
Harvard University alumni
Columbia University alumni